Amy Clampitt (June 15, 1920 – September 10, 1994) was an American poet and author.

Life
Clampitt was born on June 15, 1920, of Quaker parents, and brought up in New Providence, Iowa. In the American Academy of Arts and Letters and at nearby Grinnell College she began a study of English literature that eventually led her to poetry. She graduated from Grinnell College, and from that time on lived mainly in New York City. To support herself, she worked as a secretary at the Oxford University Press, a reference librarian at the Audubon Society, and a freelance editor. Not until the mid-1960s, when she was in her forties, did she return to writing poetry. Her first poem was published by The New Yorker in 1978. In 1983, at the age of sixty-three, she published her first full-length collection, The Kingfisher. In the decade that followed, Clampitt published five books of poetry, including What the Light Was Like (1985), Archaic Figure (1987), and Westward (1990). Her last book, A Silence Opens, appeared in 1994. She also published a book of essays and several privately printed editions of her longer poems. She taught at the College of William and Mary, Smith College, and Amherst College, but it was her time spent in Manhattan, in a remote part of Maine, and on various trips to Europe, the former Soviet Union, Iowa, Wales, and England that most directly influenced her work. Clampitt was the recipient of a 1982 Guggenheim Fellowship, a MacArthur Fellowship (1992), and she was a member of the American Academy of Arts and Letters and the American Academy of Poets. She died of cancer in September 1994.

Awards 
Clampitt earned a MacArthur Fellowship in 1992 for her writing. She was also awarded the Guggenheim Fellowship for Creative Arts, US and Canada, in 1982, under the poetry category.

Works

Poetry collections

 Multitudes, Multitudes (Washington Street Press, 1973).
 The Isthmus (1981). 
 The Summer Solstice (Sarabande Press, 1983). 
 The Kingfisher (Knopf, 1983). .
 What the Light Was Like (Knopf, 1983). .
 Archaic Figure (Knopf, 1987). .
 Westward (Knopf, 1990). . 
 Manhattan: An Elegy, and Other Poems (University of Iowa Center for the Book, 1990).
 A Silence Opens (Knopf, 1994). .
 The Collected Poems of Amy Clampitt (Knopf, 1997). .
 " A Homage to John Keats" (The Sarabande Press, 1984)

Prose
 A Homage to John Keats (Sarabande Press, 1984). 
 The Essential Donne (Ecco Press, 1988). .
 Predecessors, Et Cetera: Essays (University of Michigan Press, 1991). .

Biography
 Willard Spiegelman, Nothing Stays Put: The Life and Poetry of Amy Clampitt, Knopf, 2023.

References

External links
The Amy Clampitt Fund
Clampitt's Academy of American Poets page
Poetry Foundation page
"Clampitt, Amy: Introduction" Poetry Criticism. Vol. 19, edited by Carol T. Gaffke (Thomson Gale, 1997).
 
 Catherine Cucinella, ed., Contemporary American Women Poets: An A-Z guide

1920 births
1994 deaths
20th-century American poets
American women poets
Amherst College faculty
College of William & Mary faculty
Grinnell College alumni
MacArthur Fellows
Smith College faculty
20th-century American women writers
Members of the American Academy of Arts and Letters